Yekəxana (also, Yekaxana) is a village and municipality in the Goychay Rayon of Azerbaijan.  It has a population of 714.

References 

Populated places in Goychay District